Battersby is an English surname. It is a toponymic surname based on Battersby, North Yorkshire. Notable people with this surname include:

Sir Alan Battersby (born 1925), British organic chemist
Ashley Battersby (born 1988), American professional skier
Bradley Battersby (born 1953), American film director and screenwriter
Christine Battersby (born 1946), British philosopher
Edmund Battersby (born 1949), American classical pianist
Eileen Battersby, chief literary critic of The Irish Times
James Battersby (born 1958), Australian rower
James Johnson Battersby (1875–1949), British hat manufacturer
James Larratt Battersby (1907–1955), British fascist and pacifist
Jean Battersby (1928–2009), Australian arts executive
Lee Battersby (born 1970), Australian author
Martin Battersby (1914–1982), British trompe l'oeil artist and theatrical set decorator
Mary Battersby (fl. 1801–1841), Irish artist and naturalist. 
Matthew Battersby (1841–1899), Australian politician
Robert Battersby (1924–2002), British soldier, linguist, diplomat and politician
Roy Battersby (born 1936), British TV director
Sydney Battersby (1887–1974), English swimmer
Terence Battersby (1893–1972), English cricketer and British Army officer
Tim Battersby (born 1949), English composer and performer of children's music
Tony Battersby (born 1975), English footballer
William John Battersby (1839–1915), British hat manufacturer

See also 
Archie Battersbee (2010–2022), English schoolboy, subject of the Archie Battersbee case
Thomas Battersbee (1791–1865), schoolmaster and English cricketer

References

English toponymic surnames